The coat of arms of Port Moody.

Symbols
Supporters: A stag and a cougar hold the shield above the mount, symbolic of the area's wildlife. The supporters wear collars of maple leaves, symbolising Canada. The stag has a salmon around the neck, representing the original Coast Salish settlers, while the cougar has a railroad spike.
Crest: A mural crown, emblematic of Port Moody's designation as a city, and above that is a bandtailed pigeon, a rare local bird. 
Shield: 
Charges: Trees for the forest industry, tracks for the railway, and a clipper ship for the early port.
Mount: A fir tree forest and water suggesting the natural setting of the city.
Scroll: The city's motto: Blest by nature – Enriched by man.

Port Moody
Port Moody
Port Moody
Port Moody
Port Moody
Port Moody